Halkirk/Paintearth (Fetaz) Aerodrome  is a registered aerodrome located  north northeast of Halkirk in the County of Paintearth No. 18, Alberta, Canada.

References

Registered aerodromes in Alberta
County of Paintearth No. 18